A draftnik is a person who studies professional sports leagues drafts and covers the draft in the media. The term is most often used in reference to the NFL Draft and was coined in the mid-1980s after the draft was first televised by ESPN.

The first draftniks are typically considered to be Joel Buchsbaum and Mel Kiper, Jr.

Nowadays, there are a large number of draftniks which post their own mock drafts on websites, and some have even made a living out of it.

In 2002, TheHuddleReport.com began grading the efforts of draftniks and tracking the success of their mock draft. The Huddle Report awards 2 points for correctly predicting a team's draft pick, and 1 point for each player correctly placed in the 1st round.

External links
The Huddle Report 
Meet Joel Buchsbaum, ultimate NFL draftnik 
 TV SPORTS; ESPN Show Was a Draftnik's Nirvana 
Draftniks: The Rise of the Mini-Kipers

References

National Football League Draft